Haplochromis adolphifrederici is a species of haplochromine cichlid which is endemic to Lake Kivu. It is an insectivorous, maternal mouthbrooder. The specific name honours Duke Adolf Friedrich of Mecklenburg (1873-1969) the German explorer in Africa, a colonial politician and leader of a scientific research expedition in the region of the Central African Graben which traversed Africa from east to west, during which type was collected.

References

adolphifrederici
Fish described in 1914